The Civil Armed Forces (CAF) are a group of nine paramilitary, uniformed organisations, separate and distinct from the regular "military" Pakistan Armed Forces. They are responsible for maintaining internal security, helping law enforcement agencies, border control, counter-insurgency and counter-terrorism, riot control, and anti-smuggling under the Ministry of Interior. They frequently operate alongside the Pakistani military in response to natural disasters. They come under the direct command of the Ministry of Defence and the Pakistani military during wartime.

History 
Some CAF units were originally raised in the colonial era on the frontiers of the empire, and played a key role in the consolidation of control by building a link between the state and communities in strategically sensitive frontier areas through recruitment to government service. In many areas paramilitary units continue to play exactly the same historical role decades after independence.

The CAF are currently undergoing significant expansion of some (57) additional 'wings' approved for raising in the 2015–16 to deal with the challenging internal and border security environment and to provide security for the China-Pakistan Economic Corridor (CPEC), co-ordinated by a new 2-star command raised in September 2016, the Special Security Division.

The CAF are paid for from the budget of the Ministry of Interior which also provides administrative support. However they are (with the exception of the Frontier Constabulary) commanded by officers on secondment from the Pakistan Army. They function under the operational control of army corps headquarters, not just in war time but whenever Article 245 of the Pakistani Constitution is invoked to provide 'military aid to civil power', for example in Karachi since 2015, and in Punjab since February 2017.

List of forces 

There are a total of nine forces, although some of them share names. They can also have their command transferred to the Ministry of Defence, and effectively combined to form a reserve force for the Pakistani military during times of war.

 Punjab Rangers
 Headquartered in Lahore.
 Divided into five forces, each composed of several battalion-sized "wings" of approximately 800 men each.
 This force has a border security role on the Punjab provincial external border with India. It also performs internal security duties (counter-insurgency, counter-gang, public order, etc.) under the operational control of Pakistan Army corps commanders.

 Sindh Rangers
 Headquartered in Karachi.
 Divided into seven forces, each composed of several battalion-sized "wings" of approximately 800 men each.
 This force has a border security role on the Sindh provincial external border with India. It also performs internal security duties (counter-insurgency, counter-gang, public order, etc.) under the operational control of Pakistan Army corps commanders.

 Frontier Corps Khyber Pakhtunkhwa (North)
 Formed in 2017 by the splitting of Frontier Corps Khyber Pakhtunkhwa.
 Headquartered in Peshawar.
 Composed of eleven infantry and one armoured regiments, each formed from several battalion-sized "wings".
 Under the command of the Army's XI Corps, the force has been in the forefront of counter-insurgency operations against the Tehrik-i-Taliban Pakistan and foreign militants since 2003.

 Frontier Corps Khyber Pakhtunkhwa (South)
 Formed in 2017 by the splitting of Frontier Corps Khyber Pakhtunkhwa.
 Headquartered in Dera Ismail Khan.
 Composed of ten infantry regiments, each formed from several battalion-sized "wings".
 Under the command of the XI Corps, the force has been in the forefront of counter-insurgency operations against the Tehrik-i-Taliban Pakistan and foreign militants since 2003.

 Frontier Corps Balochistan (North)
 Formed in 2017 by the splitting of Frontier Corps Balochistan.
 Headquartered in Quetta.
 Composed of ten infantry regiments, each formed from several battalion-sized "wings".
 Under the command of the XII Corps, the force has been in the forefront of counter-insurgency operations against the Tehrik-i-Taliban Pakistan and Baloch separatists.

 Frontier Corps Balochistan (South)
 Formed in 2017 by the splitting of Frontier Corps Balochistan.
 Headquartered in Turbat.
 Composed of ten infantry regiments, each formed from several battalion-sized "wings".
 Under the command of the XII Corps, the force has been in the forefront of counter-insurgency operations against Baloch separatists.

 Frontier Constabulary
 Formed in 1915.
 Headquartered in Peshawar Cantonment.
 This is a gendarmerie that operates in the border districts of Khyber Pakhtunkhwa, which were formerly known as the Federally Administered Tribal Areas; unlike the Frontier Corps it is commanded by officers from the Police Service of Pakistan.

 Pakistan Coast Guards
 Formed in 1973.
 Headquartered in Karachi.
 The force should not be confused with the Maritime Security Agency, which is a coast guard in the Pakistan Navy. This force is charged with protecting the coastal areas of Balochistan and Sindh Province. It is largely a shore-based force with a particular focus on combatting smuggling. It is commanded by a one-star rank brigadier from the Pakistan Army.

 Gilgit Baltistan Scouts
 Formed in 2003 as a replacement CAF after the previously paramilitary Northern Light Infantry was converted into a regular infantry regiments of the Pakistan Army in recognition of their performance and heavy losses during the Kargil War.
 Headquartered in Gilgit.
 Composed of six battalion-sized "wings".
 Under the command of the Army's Force Command Northern Areas, the force has been involved in providing security for infrastructure projects in the China–Pakistan Economic Corridor.

 50 Aviation Squadron is the nucleus of an air wing designed to provide additional air support to CAFs.

Ranks

See also 
 Law enforcement in Pakistan
 Pakistan Armed Forces
 National Guard (Pakistan)
 Pakistan Levies

References

External links 
 CIA World Factbook 2005

Military of Pakistan
Reserve forces